Karuvaki was the second queen of the third Mauryan emperor, Ashoka. She was also the mother of Ashoka's son, Prince Tivala.

Life

Karuvaki is mentioned in the Queen Edict wherein her religious and charitable donations were recorded as per her wishes. This gives an image of her being a self-possessed and strong-willed consort, who wanted an act of philanthropy recorded as specifically hers.

The edict also identifies her as mother to their son, Prince Tivala (also referred to as Tivara), who is the only son of Ashoka mentioned by name in his inscriptions.

Despite the fact that Ashoka had many queens, Kaurwaki is the only queen of Ashoka, who was named in his inscriptions and edicts.

Queen's Edict
The Queen's Edict on the Allahabad Pillar refers to the charitable deeds of Karuvaki:

In popular culture
 Karuvaki was portrayed by Kareena Kapoor in the 2001 Bollywood film, Aśoka.
Saumya Seth portrays Karuvaki in Colors TV's 2015 historical drama,  Chakravartin Ashoka Samrat while Reem Sheikh portrays the young Karuvaki.
She is the main character of The Ashoka Trilogy, The Prince of Pataliputra by Shreyas  Bhave.
Kalinga Karubaki Award established by Kalinga Literary Festival to honour the great warrior princess of Kalinga

References

Sources
 * 

3rd-century BC women
Women from Odisha
Kalinga (India)
History of Odisha
Indian Buddhists
Converts to Buddhism from Hinduism
Wives of Ashoka

3rd-century BC Indian people